The Global Pet Expo is an annual trade show im the United States presented by the American Pet Products Association and the Pet Industry Distributors Association.

The 2020 Show featured 1,066 exhibitors, 3,541 booths and more than 3,000 new product launches. 6,000 pet product buyers attended the Show.

References

External links
 

Trade shows in the United States